The Borniquen Classic is a defunct tennis tournament played in 1977. It was held in San Juan in Puerto Rico and was played on outdoor hard courts.

Past finals

Singles

Doubles

External links
 WTA Results Archive

Hard court tennis tournaments
Tennis tournaments in Puerto Rico
WTA Tour
1977 in tennis
Defunct tennis tournaments in North America
1977 establishments in Puerto Rico
1977 disestablishments in Puerto Rico
1977 in Puerto Rican sports
Defunct sports competitions in Puerto Rico